Schistochila is a genus of liverwort in family Schistochilaceae. It contains the following species (but this list may be incomplete):
 Schistochila macrodonta W.E. Nicholson
 Schistochila undulatifolia Piippo
 Schistochila lehmanniana (Lehm. & Lindenb.) Carrington & Pearson

Jungermanniales
Jungermanniales genera
Taxonomy articles created by Polbot